Chanjody is a small village in Changanassery Taluk in the Kottayam district, Kerala, India .A Small Part of Chanjody Comes Under Pathanamthitta District Under Thiruvalla Revenue Division.

Administered through the Thrikodithanam panchayat, a small part of the village forms part of the district of Pathanamthitta Under Thiruvalla Constituency & Thiruvalla Revenue Division .It is known for its bright coloured houses, beautiful gardens and the three sisters.

Demographics
The population is mainly middle class Indian sub urban people with a literacy proximate to 100 percent. A large part of the population are followers of the Syro-Malabar Catholic Church, with sects of Hinduism and Christianity also present.

The basic infrastructure of the village is well developed and the nearest towns - Changanassery and Tiruvalla are just 7 kilometers apart.

Landmarks
The major landmarks of this place include St: Sebastian's Church, the parish Hall and St: Sebastian's Lower Primary School.

References

External links 

Villages in Kottayam district
Changanassery